Sarcaulus is a genus of plants in the family Sapotaceae described as a genus in 1882.

Sarcaulus is native to tropical Central and South America.

Species
 Sarcaulus brasiliensis (A.DC) Eyma - from Costa Rica to Bolivia + Amapá
 Sarcaulus inflexus (A.C.Sm.) T.D.Penn. - Amazonas, Mato Grosso
 Sarcaulus oblatus T.D.Penn. - Ecuador
 Sarcaulus vestitus (Baehni) T.D.Penn. - Amazonas, Acre
 Sarcaulus wurdackii Aubrév. - Amazonas Region in Peru

References

 
Sapotaceae genera
Taxonomy articles created by Polbot